Kooman is a 2022 Indian Malayalam-language mystery thriller film directed by Jeethu Joseph, written by K. R. Krishna Kumar and jointly produced by Listin Stephen and Allwin Antony. The film stars Asif Ali, with Renji Panicker, Jaffar Idukki, Baburaj, Hannah Reji Koshy, and Meghanathan. The plot follows Giri Shankar, a C.P.O. disregarded by his colleagues and looked upon with contempt by his villagers, as he takes revenge for a humiliating incident, his life turns upside down. The original background score and a song was composed by Vishnu Shyam.

Principal photography began in February 2022. Kooman was released in theatres on 4 November 2022.

Plot

Giri Shankar is a young C.P.O. in his village police station. He is very observant and has expertise in finding clues. As a result, the Circle Inspector Pillai and the Sub Inspector Sukumaran appreciate his detective skills, which also makes a few constables jealous. He is often annoyed by arrogant villagers who disrespects him.

CI Pilai scolds Giri for trying to file a drug smuggling case on a young man who told Giri to remember his place as a constable. CI Pillai then retires from duty and a new Circle Inspector named Harilal takes charge there. He is an egoistic cop who insults Giri for no reason. But after a few incidents, CI Harilal and two constables get suspended.

Cast

Production

Development
Kooman was announced on 2 February 2022 with a title motion poster poster. Jeethu said it is a thriller.

Filming
The makers started the principal photography on 24 February 2022 with the switch-on ceremony. It took 32 days to complete the shoot. The post-production of the film started in March and Jeethu Joseph himself announced the release date when the promotions for the film were ongoing.

Music
The original background score and songs were composed by Vishnu Shyam.

Release
The film was released on 4 November 2022. The official trailer of the film was released on 27 October 2022.
The film received positive reviews.

References

External links
 

2022 films
2022 thriller films
2020s Malayalam-language films
Indian mystery thriller films
Films directed by Jeethu Joseph